This is a list of the Austrian Singles Chart number-one hits of 2003.

See also
2003 in music

References

Austria
2003 in Austria
2003